Katri Javanainen (born 4 March 1969) is a Finnish retired ice hockey player. As a member of the Finnish national ice hockey team, she won European Championship gold medals in 1989 and 1991 and a bronze medal at the 1990 IIHF Women's World Championship.

Playing career 
Javanainen's elite level club career was played in the Naisten SM-sarja with Porin Ässät. She was the second highest scoring player for Ässät during their tenure in the Naisten SM-sarja, tallying 71 goals and 38 assists for 109 points in 100 regular season games.

International 
Javanainen represented Finland in a total of 30 A-level international matches during 1988 to 1991. During that span, she recorded 13 goals and 25 assists for 38 total points.

International statistics 

Sources:

References

External links
 

Living people
1969 births
Ässät Naiset players